Edward Theuns (born 30 April 1991) is a Belgian racing cyclist, who currently rides for UCI WorldTeam . He rode for his national team at the 2014 UCI Road World Championships.

Career
He took his first victory in August 2014 in the Grote Prijs Stad Zottegem. In 2015, he began his season with four top-ten finishes at the Étoile de Bessèges, finishing fifth overall and winning the points classification. He took his second career win in March 2015 with victory in the Ronde van Drenthe. In August 2015 it was announced that Theuns would join  for the 2016 season. He was named in the start list for the 2016 Tour de France and the 2017 Vuelta a España.

Major results

 2010
 8th Overall Le Triptyque des Monts et Châteaux
1st Stage 4
 2012
 8th Paris–Tours Espoirs
 2013
 1st Stage 2a (ITT) Le Triptyque des Monts et Châteaux
 1st  Mountains classification, Giro della Regione Friuli Venezia Giulia
 2nd Overall Tour du Piémont Vosgien
 3rd Time trial, National Under-23 Road Championships
 6th Liège–Bastogne–Liège Espoirs
 7th GP Briek Schotte
 8th Paris–Tours Espoirs
 10th La Côte Picarde
 2014
 1st Grote Prijs Stad Zottegem
 3rd Handzame Classic
 4th Châteauroux Classic
 7th Omloop van het Waasland
 2015
 1st Ronde van Drenthe
 1st Stage 3 Tour de l'Eurométropole
 2nd Dwars door Vlaanderen
 2nd Scheldeprijs
 2nd Rund um Köln
 3rd Halle–Ingooigem
 4th Dwars door Drenthe
 4th Nationale Sluitingsprijs
 5th Overall Étoile de Bessèges
1st  Points classification
 5th Overall Ster ZLM Toer
 5th Clásica de Almería
 5th Ronde van Zeeland Seaports
 7th Overall Four Days of Dunkirk
1st Stage 5
 7th Overall World Ports Classic
 7th Grand Prix d'Ouverture La Marseillaise
 8th Paris–Tours
 8th Grand Prix de Fourmies
 9th Schaal Sels
2016
 1st Stage 1 Tour of Belgium
 3rd Dwars door Vlaanderen
 3rd Halle–Ingooigem
 4th Scheldeprijs
 8th Omloop Het Nieuwsblad
 8th Kuurne–Brussels–Kuurne
 Tour de France
Held  after Stage 1
2017
 Tour of Turkey
1st  Points classification
1st Stage 6
 1st Stage 4 BinckBank Tour
 2nd Halle–Ingooigem
 5th Down Under Classic
 6th Road race, UEC European Road Championships
 7th Overall Three Days of De Panne
 8th Paris–Roubaix
2018
 6th Omloop Het Nieuwsblad
2019
 1st Primus Classic
 6th Omloop van het Houtland
 9th Kampioenschap van Vlaanderen
2020
 5th Road race, National Road Championships
2021
 1st Stage 5 Tour de Hongrie
 2nd Road race, National Road Championships
 8th Overall Étoile de Bessèges
 8th Clásica de Almería
  Combativity award Stage 2 Tour de France
2022
 2nd Paris–Tours
 3rd Grand Prix d'Isbergues
 5th Scheldeprijs
 6th Eschborn–Frankfurt
 7th Paris–Bourges
2023
 2nd Nokere Koerse
 3rd Le Samyn
 10th Bredene Koksijde Classic

Grand Tour general classification results timeline

References

External links

 
 
 
 
 

1991 births
Living people
Belgian male cyclists
Sportspeople from Ghent
Cyclists from East Flanders